Eugenio Pisani (born December 7, 1991 in Santa Margherita Ligure) is an Italian auto racing driver from Ravenna.

From 2006, he competed in Italian Karting Championship. In his first year, he finished the championship third and in the following year in fifth place. 
Pisani began racing cars (Italian Championship) in 2014  with his teammate Fabio Fabiani (who won the 2011 WTCC Jay-Ten Trophy) in a Seat Leon Supercopa Long-Run. At his first season he ended third in the Italian Seat Leon Supercopa Trophy and fifth in the "Coppa Italia". 

In 2015 he raced in the Lotus Cup Italy ending 4th overall with two podiums (2nd-3rd) and two 4th places over six races.

In 2016, he competed in the TCR Italian Series with a Seat Leon TCR by BF Motorsport and in the Italian Prototype Championship with a Norma M20F - Honda 2000 (CN2 Class) for Siliprandi Racing. winning the Under 25 Italian Prototype Championship and ending fifth overall.

In 2017 he won the Italian GT Cup Championship on board his Porsche 997 GT3 Cup.

In 2018 he still competed in the Italian GT Cup Championship with Vincenzo Sauto, sharing the Porsche 997 GT3 Cup of Siliprandi Racing Team.

In 2019 he competed in the GT Cup Open Europe driving the Porsche 991 GT3 Cup of Duell Racing Team based in Limena (Padua). He shared the car with Michele Merendino, Mark Speakerwas and Stefano Bozzoni. 
With Stefano Bozzoni he's going to participate to the 2021 GT Cup Open Europe driving the Porsche 991 GT3 Cup of Came Racing Team, followed by Sport Racing ASD.

In 2021, with Stefano Bozzoni, he attended GT Cup Open Europe with Came Racing Team (SP Racing) ending 8th overall and 6th in Pro-Am Class with a Porsche 991 GT3 Cup.

In 2022 he is still racing with Porsche in GT Cup Open Europe with Stefano Zanini.

References

External links
 

Italian racing drivers
Sportspeople from Ravenna
1991 births
Living people